Marlon Davis may refer to:

Marlon Davis (American football)
Marlon Davis (comedian)